The president of Syria, officially the president of the Syrian Arab Republic is the head of state of the Syrian Arab Republic. They are vested with sweeping powers that may be delegated, at their sole discretion to their vice presidents. They appoint and dismiss the prime minister and other members of the Council of Ministers (the cabinet) and military officers. Bashar al-Assad is the 19th and current president of Syria. Bashar Al-Assad is the son of former president, Hafez al-Assad, who was the longest-serving president serving 29 years. Al-Assad is currently the second longest-serving president marking the 22nd year of his presidency in 2022 when he entered the post on 17 July 2000.

Term of office
Article 88 of the 2012 constitution states that the president serves a seven year term and "can be elected for only one more successive term." Article 155 states that Article 88 applies to the president "as of the next presidential elections."

Eligibility criteria

On 31 January 1973, Hafez al-Assad implemented a new constitution, which led to a national crisis. Unlike previous constitutions, this one did not require that the president of Syria must be a Muslim, leading to fierce demonstrations in Hama, Homs and Aleppo organized by the Muslim Brotherhood and the ulama. They labeled Assad as the "enemy of God" and called for a jihad against his rule. Robert D. Kaplan has compared Assad's coming to power to "an untouchable becoming maharajah in India or a Jew becoming tsar in Russia—an unprecedented development shocking to the Sunni majority population which had monopolized power for so many centuries." The main objection to the constitution from demonstrators was that Islam was not specified as the state religion. In response to riots, the Syrian Constitution of 1973 was amended to stipulate that Islam was the religion of the president.

A new constitution was approved in February 2012. Article 84 of Syria's 2012 constitution requires that candidates for the presidency must:
Be at least 40 years old 
Be Syrian by birth, of parents who are Syrians by birth
Enjoy  civil  and  political  rights  and  not  convicted  of  a  dishonorable  felony, even if he was reinstated
Not be married to a non-Syrian wife
Have lived in Syria for 10 years continuously upon nomination

Further eligibility requirements in the 2012 constitution include: 
The religion of the President of the Republic is Islam; Islamic jurisprudence shall be a major source of legislation; The State shall respect all religions, and ensure the freedom to perform all the rituals that do not prejudice public order; The personal status of religious communities shall be protected and respected. (Article 3, which describes the office of the presidency.  The requirements in the section including the age requirement are from the section on the requirements for nomination.)

A candidate must be supported by at least 35 members of the People's Assembly (Article 85)
The President cannot carry another nationality (Article 152)

Powers and removal
Powers:

Commander in Chief of the army and armed forces
Representing Syria in international relations
Developing and implementing national policy
Appointing and dismissing the Prime Minister and Ministers
Creating and overseeing the implementation of general state policy
Vetoing or accepting laws
Declaring a state of emergency
Concluding international treaties
Granting amnesty
Granting honors and medals
Dissolving the People’s Assembly
Passing laws when the legislature is not in session or in emergency situations
Submitting matters to binding national referendum
Drafting laws
Removal
Upon submission of resignation to the People’s Assembly
At the end of 7-year term if not nominated for re-election, or second 7-year term if re-elected
In the case of permanent incapacity or death
Upon conviction for high treason by the Constitutional Court after proposal by one-third of Assembly and approval by two-thirds

List of presidents

Latest election

References

External links

Politics of Syria
Government of Syria